The Russian Embassy in Germany is the headquarters of the diplomatic mission of the Russian Federation in Germany. It is located in the Mitte district of the capital Berlin and occupies a building complex consisting of the main building at 63-65 Unter den Linden and several administrative and residential buildings on the Behrenstraße and Glinkastraße.

The current Russian ambassador to Germany is Sergei Nechaev who was appointed on 10 January 2018.

History
A permanent diplomatic mission was initially established by the Tsardom of Russia in Berlin in 1706, at the time the capital of the Kingdom of Prussia. It was reopened as the embassy of the Russian Soviet Federative Socialist Republic in 1917 and then of the Soviet Union from 1922. Upon the German invasion of the Soviet Union in 1941, the embassy became an internment camp before being occupied by the Reich Ministry for the Occupied Eastern Territories from 1942. The Palais Kurland was destroyed by bombing raids in Berlin during the Second World War. 

The Soviet Union constructed the current embassy building, three times larger than the Palais Kurland and combining both Russian and Soviet architecture, which opened on 7 November 1952 to celebrate October Revolution Day. It was built in East Berlin to serve as the Soviet embassy to East Germany, as the site of the Kurland Palace was located in the Soviet Occupation Zone after the war. From 1961, the embassy was located a short distance from the Berlin Wall. Following the reunification of Germany in 1990 and the dissolution of the Soviet Union in 1991, the embassy was inherited by the Federal Republic of Germany and the Russian Federation, respectively.

On 5 November 2021, it was revealed that a Russian diplomat had died at the embassy, apparently having fallen out of a higher story of the building. It was later revealed by Der Spiegel that German intelligence services believed he was an FSB agent, and Bellingcat stated that he was the son of a senior FSB official.

References

External links
  (German and Russian)
 Embassy profile in Berlin Global

Diplomatic missions in Berlin
Diplomatic missions of Russia
Germany–Russia relations